Gloria Campaner (born 5 April 1986) is an Italian pianist. She was born in Jesolo (Venice), Italy in 1986.

Education

Born in the Venetian inlands, she started playing the piano at the age of 4 under the guidance of Daniela Vidali, she performed her first public recital at 5 and made her debut with the Venice Symphony Orchestra at the age of 12 with Margola piano concerto. Ms. Campaner earned her master's degree with Bruno Mezzena at the Music Academy in Pescara and has performed in masterclasses with such distinguished musicians as Jerome Rose, Sergio Perticaroli, Pavel Gililov, Lilya Zilberstein, Dmitri Bashkirov, and Boris Petrushansky following courses at prestigious institutions such as Oxford Hertford College, Accademia Incontri col Maestro di Imola, Salzburg Mozarteum, Ticino Musica, Mannes School of Music – New York. She focused her studies on the Russian school under the guidance of Konstantin Bogino while following university lectures on Russian language and literature. Ms. Campaner moved to Germany in 2008 where she earned her ‘konzert exam’ diploma at the HFM Karlsruhe with Prof. Fany Solter.

Awards

Gloria Campaner is a laureate of several international competitions such as the Paderewski International Piano Competition in Los Angeles (Silver Medal, Best Paderewski and Chopin performances), the Ibla Grand Prize (First Prize, Prokofiev Special Award), the XI Concours International de Musique du Maroc in Casablanca (Prix de Jury, Franz Liszt), and the Cultural Foundation Pro Europa in Freiburg (European Prize for Culture).
In 2009 Gloria received an artistic residency by the Brahms Foundation of Baden-Baden. During the 2011–12 season, Ms. Campaner was named ‘Ambassador of Culture’ from the European Union for the project ‘Piano: Reflect de la Culture Europeenne.’ and she was resident musician at the Italian Institute of Culture in Paris ( ‘Les Promesses de l’Art’- 2013).  In 2014, she was awarded a fellowship by the London's Borletti-Buitoni Trust, the first Italian female pianist to receive such an honor.

Career

Ms. Campaner has performed orchestras such as the English Chamber Orchestra, Baden-Baden Philharmonic, Süd-Deutsche Philharmonic, Seoul Philharmonic, AfiA Orchestra of Tokyo, Johannesburg Philharmonic Orchestra, RTSI Orchestra in Lugano, along with appearances at prestigious venues such as London's Cadogan Hall, Los Angeles’ Disney Hall, Salzburg Mozarteum, NCPA Beijing, Kioi Hall Tokyo, Paris Salle Cortot, Warsaw & Krakow Philharmonie, Auditorium Parco della Musica in Rome.

Ms. Campaner often performs with such artists as Johannes Moser, Ivry Gitlis, Ana Chumachenco, Michael Kugel, Sergei Krylov, Quartetto di Cremona as well as with members from prestigious orchestras such as the Berlin Philharmonic, Stuttgart Radio Symphony, La Scala Philharmonic, National Orchestra of Santa Cecilia in Rome and Royal Concertgebouw Orchestra and unusual collaborations such as jazz musician Leszek Możdżer, visual artist Natan Sinigaglia, and Luigi Lo Cascio, one of Italy's most recognized actor.  Gloria also makes an appearance as pianist and actress in Philippe Caland's soon-to-be-released independent movie "The Butterfly Confirmation."  During the summer of 2017, Ms. Campaner was resident artist at the Marlboro Festival, working along with pianists such as Mitsuko Uchida and Leon Fleisher.

Gloria Campaner is artistic director of the "Associazione Bellini" concert series in Messina, Sicily.

Recordings
Her debut CD was released in 2013 by EMI. A live CD of her concert in Turin performing Rachmaninoff Second Piano Concerto with RAI National Symphony Orchestra & Juraj Valčuha was released in 2016 by Warner Classics. A second live recording of Schumann’s Piano Concerto was released by Warner in 2018 (Nomination ICMA 2020). In 2021 a solo CD dedicated to Chopin’s 24 Préludes Op. 28 has been released by Warner.

Personal life
She lives in Turin with her life partner Alessandro Baricco.

References

Sources
 Gloria Campaner Interview for CIDIM
 Gloria Campaner Biography on La Musica di Rai3

External links
 Gloria Campaner Official Website
 Gloria Campaner Facebook Page
 Borletti-Buitoni Trust : Gloria Campaner

Living people
Italian women pianists
1986 births
21st-century pianists
Women classical pianists
21st-century women pianists